The Symington family is a family of politicians from the United States. Below is a list of some of the members:
 James S. Wadsworth (1807–1864), a candidate for Governor of New York 1862. He was the father of James Wolcott Wadsworth.
 James Wolcott Wadsworth (1846–1926), the New York Comptroller 1880–1881, U.S. Representative from New York 1881–1885, 1891–1907. The son of James S. Wadsworth.
 John Hay (1838–1905), the U.S. Ambassador to the United Kingdom 1897–1898, the U.S. Secretary of State 1898–1905. The father-in-law of James Wolcott Wadsworth, Jr.
 James Wolcott Wadsworth Jr. (1877–1952), a New York Assemblyman 1905–1910, a U.S. Senator from New York 1915–1927, a U.S. Representative from New York 1933–1951. The son of James Wolcott Wadsworth.
 Stuart Symington (1901–1988), the Secretary of the Air Force 1947–1950, a U.S. Senator from Missouri 1953–1976, a candidate for Democratic nomination for President of the United States in 1960. The son-in-law of James Wolcott Wadsworth, Jr.
 J. Fife Symington Jr. (1910–2007), a candidate for U.S. Representative from Maryland in 1958, 1960, and 1962, the U.S. Ambassador to Trinidad and Tobago 1969–1971. A cousin of Stuart Symington.
 John Hay Whitney (1904–1982), the U.S. Ambassador to the United Kingdom 1957–1961. A grandson of John Hay.
 James W. Symington (born 1927), a U.S. Representative from Missouri (1969–77), and the son of Stuart Symington.
 Fife Symington III (born 1945), Governor of Arizona, 1991–97. Son of J. Fife Symington Jr.
 W. Stuart Symington IV (born 1952) The U.S. Ambassador to Nigeria (2016-present), to Rwanda (2008-11), and to Djibouti (2006-08). The son of Stuart Symington Jr., and Janey Studt Symington, and a grandson of Stuart Symington. Whitney's wife, Betsey Cushing Roosevelt Whitney, was also the former wife of U.S. Representative James Roosevelt.

See also
 List of United States political families

References

American families of English ancestry
Political families of the United States